"Om" is a song by Swedish singer-songwriter Niklas Strömstedt from his fourth studio album of the same name (1990).

Track listing and formats 

 European 7-inch single

A. "Om" – 4:06
B. "Stanna kvar!" – 3:42

Credits and personnel 

 Niklas Strömstedt – songwriter, producer, vocals, arranger
 Bernard Löhr – producer, arranger, engineering
 Mikael Jansson – cover art, photographer
 Mikael Varhelyi – cover art designer

Credits and personnel adopted from the Om! album and 7-inch single liner notes.

Charts

Weekly charts

Certifications

References

External links 

 

1990 songs
1990 singles
Niklas Strömstedt songs
Number-one singles in Sweden
Polar Music singles
Songs written by Niklas Strömstedt
Swedish-language songs
Warner Music Group singles